Mary Isabella "Peta" Taylor, married name Mary Jager, (11 July 1912 – 22 March 1989) was an English cricketer who played as a right-arm medium bowler. She appeared in seven Test matches for England between 1934 and 1937, including the first ever women's Test match. She played domestic cricket for various composite XIs, as well as South Women.

References

External links
 
 
 State Library of New South Wales: Sam Hood, 1872-1953 Mary 'Peta' Taylor from the English women's cricket team (photograph)

1912 births
1989 deaths
People from Wimbledon, London
England women Test cricketers